Bernadette Van Roy (born 10 September 1948) is a Belgian middle-distance runner. She competed in the women's 1500 metres at the 1976 Summer Olympics. Van Roy also competed at the Praha European Championships in Praha and 6th IAAF World Cross Country Championships in Glasgow.

References

External links
 

1948 births
Living people
Athletes (track and field) at the 1976 Summer Olympics
Belgian female middle-distance runners
Olympic athletes of Belgium
Place of birth missing (living people)